John Glasier (September 3, 1809 – July 7, 1894) was a Canadian lumberman and politician.  His surname also appears as Glazier.

Born in Lincoln, New Brunswick, the son of Benjamin Glasier, he was elected to the Legislative Assembly of New Brunswick for Sunbury in the 1861 election. In 1842, he married Emmaline Garraty. A Liberal, he was re-elected in 1865. A supporter of Confederation, he was appointed to the Senate of Canada in 1868, representing the senatorial division of Sunbury, New Brunswick. He died in office of cholera in Ottawa in 1894.

References

External links
 
 

1809 births
1894 deaths
Canadian senators from New Brunswick
New Brunswick Liberal Association MLAs